Woody Allen is a live 1964 comedy album by the American comedian and later notable film director Woody Allen. This was Allen's debut recording, and was recorded at Mister Kelly's nightclub in Chicago. It was the first of three comedy albums released by Allen, the three albums were issued in a 2014 boxset, The Stand-Up Years: 1964–1968.

It was nominated for the Grammy Award for Best Comedy Performance at the 7th Annual Grammy Awards in 1965; it lost to Bill Cosby's album I Started Out as a Child, which coincidentally had also been recorded at Mister Kelly's.

Reception
Billboard magazine highlighted the album as a Comedy Spotlight in their July 25, 1964 issue and wrote that "He is a very funny fellow. The material is uniformly hilarious throughout the album. Of course Allen's delivery is polished to a point whereby he may soon be the nation's No 1. comedian".

Track listing
 "Private Life"
 "Brooklyn (incl. Floyd)"
 "The Army"
 "Pets (incl. Spot)"
 "My Grandfather"
 "My Marriage"
 "The Bullet"
 "N.Y.U."
 "A Love Story"
 "The Police (incl. Library Book, Neanderthal)"
 "Summing Up"

Personnel
Scotty Schacter, Jerry De Clercq – engineer
Don Bronstein – photography
Jack Lewis – producer

Influence 
Many comedians have cited Allen's influence on them and their work. In an interview John Mulaney specified that he had listened to Allen's 1965 album.

Awards

References

1960s comedy albums
1960s spoken word albums
1965 debut albums
1965 live albums
Albums recorded at Mister Kelly's
Woody Allen albums
Colpix Records live albums
Live comedy albums
Spoken word albums by American artists
Live spoken word albums
Stand-up comedy albums